Patharawarin Timkul (born  March 1, 1977) is a Thai actress and model. Her films include Bangkok Dangerous and Jan Dara. She is the daughter of leading Thai dance theater figure and National Artist, Performing Arts branch Patravadi Mejudhon. Her nickname is May.

Biography

Patharawarin was trained as a ballerina and dancer as a child, and first found work as a model and acting in television commercials. She has appeared as the cover girl on a number of Thai magazines, and has found steady work in the Thai film industry since her first feature-film role in Bangkok Dangerous (1999), the debut film from the Pang Brothers. She co-starred as Aom, a worker in a go-go bar and contact for the protagonist gunman. She has appeared in mostly crime films and in films where she plays a vixen. Another of her well-known roles was as Khun Kaew in Nonzee Nimibutr's erotic drama, Jan Dara.

She has also on occasion appeared in performances at her mother's open air theater, the Patravadi Theatre, located in Bangkok Yai.

In 2005, May represented Thailand as an ambassador to the World Youth Peace Summit.

Alternate English spellings of her name include Patarvarin Timkul, Patarawarin Timkul, Pataravarin Timkul or Patawarin Timkul.

Filmography
 The Sanctuary (2009)
 Body (2007)
 The Innocent Killer (2006)
 Affectionate Murder (2005)
 The Sin  (2004)
 Femme Fatale (2004)
 Yah Nark (2004) – promoted as the first Thai 3-D film.
 Butterfly in Grey (Malee) (2002)
 Jan Dara (2001) – as Khun Kaew
 Bangkok Dangerous (1999) – as Aom

Television series

External links
 Patravadi Theatre

 World Youth Peace Summit profile

1979 births
Timkul, Patharwarin
Patharawarin Timkul
Patharawarin Timkul
Patharawarin Timkul
Patharawarin Timkul
Patharawarin Timkul
VJs (media personalities)